Countess Maria Felicitas von Schönburg-Glauchau (15 August 1958 – 27 January 2019), also known as Maya von Schönburg, was a German socialite.

Early life and family 
Countess Maya von Schönburg-Glauchau was born on 15 August 1958 to Joachim, Count of Schönburg-Glauchau and his first wife, Countess Beatrix Széchenyi de Sárvár-Felsővidék. Her father was the nominal successor head of the mediatized German comital Schönburg-Glauchau. Her mother is the great-granddaughter of the Hungarian social reformer Count István Széchenyi.

Maya was the sister of Count Carl-Alban, Count Alexander, and Princess Gloria von Thurn und Taxis. She was the half-sister of Countess Anabel from her father's second marriage to Ursula Zwicker.

In the 1960s, Countess Maya von Schönburg-Glauchau's family moved to Togo due to her father's profession as a journalist and foreign correspondent. They later moved to Somalia, where she was educated at an Italian missionary school in Mogadishu. The family returned to Germany in 1970, residing in Meckenheim in the Rhineland. Following the reunification of Germany in 1990, her father reclaimed the family's estates in Saxony which had been taken by the Soviets after World War II.

Countess von Schönburg-Glauchau was the maternal aunt of Princess Maria Theresia, Princess Elisabeth, and Albert, 12th Prince of Thurn and Taxis.

Personal life 
In 1985 Countess von Schönburg-Glauchau married Friedrich Christian Flick, founder of the Friedrich Christian Flick Collection and heir to the Flick family fortune. They had three children: Friedrich-Alexander, Maria-Pilar, and Ernst-Moritz. They divorced in 1993. She later had a daughter, Maria Carlotta Beatrice, with her then-partner Stefan Hipp. The countess lived in Parkside House at Englefield Green, a former residence of Marilyn Monroe, before moving to Italy in 2011. In 2012, she was diagnosed with terminal lung cancer and moved back to Germany to receive treatment.

A Traditionalist Catholic, Countess von Schönburg-Glauchau went on pilgrimages with her sister Princess Gloria to Santiago de Compostela Cathedral and Sanctuary of Our Lady of Lourdes, to which she partially credited with her recovery from cancer. She stated in an interview with Die Welt that at Christmas time her family does not celebrate Santa Claus, instead choosing to celebrate the Christkind.

The countess was in a committed relationship with former Sotheby's chairman Henry Wyndham.

In 2008 Countess von Schönburg-Glauchau voiced her opinion on family life and a woman's role, stating that she believed women are meant to raise children and that mothers should not have careers.

She was frequently photographed at fashion, art, and society events in Germany and in England.

Legal issues 
In 2013, Countess Maya von Schönburg-Glauchau faced a tribunal in Reading, Berkshire, for the treatment of her former housekeeper, Teresa Filipowska, whom she had hired in 2008 while living at Parkside House. Filipowska alleged that she was fired for becoming pregnant without her employer's consent, and also claimed that she was overworked and mistreated by the countess. The tribunal ordered the countess to pay Filipowska £19,000 on the grounds of unfair dismissal, sex discrimination, and unpaid wages.

Death 
Countess Maya von Schönburg-Glauchau's lung cancer returned. On 27 January 2019 she died from complications relating to cancer while staying at her mother's home in Munich. She was buried in Northern Cemetery in Munich after a Catholic funeral service was held at the Cathedral of Our Lady on 2 February 2019.

Ancestry

References 

1958 births
2019 deaths
Deaths from lung cancer in Germany
Flick family
German socialites
German countesses
German Roman Catholics
German traditionalist Catholics
German people of Hungarian descent
German people of Russian descent
German expatriates in England
Maya
People from Berlin
Maya